Classic Christmas is the third studio album and first Christmas album by the British singer Joe McElderry. It was released on 25 November 2011. It is his second album released under Decca Records.

Background
Before the album's official announcement, it was available to pre-order from Play.com, Amazon.co.uk and HMV.com. On 6 October, McElderry announced that he was working on the album on Twitter and later on his official website. The album features a collaboration with one of his Popstar to Operastar mentors, Rolando Villazón. A limited Christmas gift edition was announced, it includes the album along with his previous album, Classic, the set also includes a signed photograph, a keyring, and a tag from McElderry on the hand wrapped box.

Promotion
An advert was filmed, directed by Steve Lucker, it features McElderry outside in the snow, collecting logs and taking them to a large house preparing for a Christmas party, singing a selection of songs of the album. 2 short music videos were made from the footage that was filmed, "Last Christmas" and "O Come All Ye Faithful".

On 8 December, he performed at Durham Cathedral to an audience of 1,500, singing, "In the Bleak Midwinter" and David Essex's "A Winter's Tale", with a new verse written by Tim Rice. He will introduce The Nutcracker at The O2 arena from 27 December 2011 to 30 December 2011.

Reception

Prior the release of the album, Entertainment Focus praised the album, calling it "another winning release from Joe McElderry", giving the album 4/5 stars.

Track listing

Charts
During the album's first week of release in the United Kingdom, 34,043 copies of the album were sold at retail in the country, and the album debuted at number 15 on the UK Albums Chart.

The album debuted at number 73 on the Irish Albums Chart.

Personnel

Joe McElderry - Vocals
City of Prague Philharmonic Orchestra - Orchestra
Brighton Festival Chorus - Choir (1, 3, 5, 7, 8)
Brighton Festival Youth Choir - Choir (2, 5)
James Morgan - Conductor, Producer, Orchestral arrangements and programming, Keyboards, Mixing, Editing (2, 3, 5, 7, 10, 12)
Juliette Pochin - Producer, Mixing, Editing, Orchestral arrangements and programming, Keyboards (2, 3, 5, 7, 10, 12)
Stephen Higgins - Conductor (1, 3, 5, 7, 8)
Steven Baker - Producer, Orchestral arrangements and programming (1, 4, 6, 8, 9, 11)
Kathryn Tickell - Northumbrian Bagpipes
Craig Hendry - Bass guitar
Per Lindvall - Drums
Friðrik Karlsson - Guitar (1, 4)
Andy Greenwood - Trumpet (12)
Lucia Svehlova - Violin (9)
Rolando Villazón - Vocals (5)

Release history

References

2011 albums
Joe McElderry albums
2011 Christmas albums
Christmas albums by English artists
Covers albums
Classical Christmas albums